Base Borden Military Museum is a military museum located on the grounds of CFB Borden, in Borden, Ontario, Canada. Combining four separate museums, it has numerous items, equipment and vehicles from all eras of Canadian military history, including a large number of historic armored vehicles and aircraft displayed outside in the Major-General F. F. Worthington Memorial Park and around the base.

The museum is located about 100 km north of Toronto, Ontario. The museum, which combines all the separate museums at the base, was established in the 1990s.

In June 2007 a new main building for the museum complex was opened, with a large hangar for the display of historic military vehicles. The museum complex consists of several buildings and a memorial park.

The Museum is affiliated with: CMA,  CHIN, OMMC and Virtual Museum of Canada.

Photos

See also

Organization of Military Museums of Canada
Elgin Military Museum,
Maritime Museum of the Atlantic
National Air Force Museum of Canada
The Military Museums,
The Queen's Own Cameron Highlanders of Canada Museum
Virtual Museum of Canada
Organization of Military Museums of Canada
Military history of Canada

References

External links

Borden Military Museum
Description of "Air Museum" in Borden, part of BMMM, from www.airforce.gc.ca
Toronto Star article about the reopening of the museum

Military and war museums in Canada
Tank museums
Museums in Simcoe County